Orange City is a city in, and the county seat of, Sioux County, Iowa, United States.  Its population was 6,267 in the 2020 census, an increase from 5,582 in 2000. Named after William of Orange, the community maintains its Dutch settler traditions visibly, with Dutch storefront architecture and an annual Tulip Festival.

History and culture
Orange City was first called Holland and was later renamed in honor of Dutch royalty, the Duke of Orange. The city was founded in 1870 by settlers from Pella, Iowa looking for cheaper and better land.

As the county seat of Sioux County, the city is the location of the Sioux County Courthouse, which is listed on the National Register of Historic Places.

Geography
Orange City is located at  (43.005498, −96.058796).

Demographics

2010 census
As of the census of 2010, 6,004 people, 1,905 households, and 1,405 families were living in the city. The racial makeup of the city was 93.2% White, 0.6% African American, 0.3% Native American, 1.4% Asian, 3.4% from other races, and 1.0% from two or more races. Hispanics or Latinos of any race were 7.0% of the population.

Of the 1,905 households, 33.8% had children under 18 living with them, 67.0% were married couples living together, 4.7% had a female householder with no husband present, 2.0% had a male householder with no wife present, and 26.2% were not families. About 23.5% of all households were made up of individuals, and 10.5% had someone living alone who was 65 or older. The average household size was 2.61, and the average family size was 3.08.

The median age in the city was 29.1 years; 23.1% of residents were under 18, 22.2% were between 18 and 24, 19.3% were from 25 to 44, 20.7% were from 45 to 64, and 14.7% were 65  or older. The gender makeup of the city was 47.3% male and 52.7% female.

2000 census
As of the census of 2000, 5,582 people, 1,719 households, and 1,285 families were living in the city. The population density was 1,808.5 people/sq mi (697.5/km). The 1,805 housing units had an average density of 584.8/sq mi (225.5/km). The racial makeup of the city was 97.51% White, 0.50% African American, 0.05% Native American, 0.97% Asian, 0.61% from other races, and 0.36% from two or more races. Hispanics or Latino of any race were 1.13% of the population.

There were 1,719 households, out of which 35.8% had children under the age of 18 living with them, 69.8% were married couples living together, 4.0% had a female householder with no husband present, and 25.2% were not families. About 23.9% of all households were made up of individuals, and 10.8% had someone living alone who was 65 or older. The average household size was 2.58, and the average family size was 3.07.

In the city, the age distribution was 22.7% under 18, 24.9% from 18 to 24, 20.2% from 25 to 44, 16.3% from 45 to 64, and 15.9% who were 65 or older. The median age was 28 years. For every 100 females, there were 85.7 males. For every 100 females 18 and over, there were 80.6 males.

The median income for a household in the city was $39,721, and for a family was $49,076. Males had a median income of $33,965 versus $21,130 for females. The per capita income for the city was $17,413. About 4.4% of families and 4.8% of the population were below the poverty line, including 3.8% of those under age 18 and 10.7% of those age 65 or over.

Economy
Major companies headquartered in Orange City include Diamond Vogel, Pizza Ranch, and Revival Animal Health Systems.

Employers in Orange City are:
 Diamond Vogel and Old Masters – >800 employees
 Orange City Area Health System – 500 employees
 Staples Promotional Products – 400 employees
 Northwestern College – 300 employees
 Revival Animal Health – 70 employees between its Orange City and Mapleton, Iowa facilities
 CIVCO (Radiation Oncology division) – 270 employees worldwide
 EZ-Liner – 50 employees
 Silent Drive – 40 employees
 Pizza Ranch – 30 office staff
 AIM Aerospace – 110 employees
 Van Beek Natural Science – 25 employees

Education
MOC-Floyd Valley Community School District is the local school district. The district formed on July 1, 1994 with the merger of the Maurice-Orange City and Floyd Valley districts. Public schools serving the community are Orange City Elementary School, MOC-Floyd Valley Middle School in Alton, and MOC-Floyd Valley High School in Orange City. The current Orange City Elementary building opened in the early 1920s. As per the 2020 bond, it will be rebuilt.

Private schools include Orange City Christian School, and Unity Christian High School in the War Eagle Conference.

Orange City is home to Northwestern College, a Christian liberal arts college affiliated with the Reformed Church in America. As of August 2011, 1,243 students were enrolled – 59% female and 41% male.

It is also within 30 miles of Northwest Iowa Community College in Sheldon, which was started in 1966 as a pilot program sponsored by the Department of Education in cooperation with the local high schools. It enrolls over 1,000 students per year (58% female, 42% male as of 2005).

Religion
Orange City is traditionally a Dutch Reformed community with several congregations from the Christian Reformed Church of North America, United Reformed Churches in North America, and Reformed Church in America denominations. The city also has congregations from the Lutheran Church–Missouri Synod, Southern Baptist Convention, Presbyterian Church in America, Episcopal, Christian and Missionary Alliance, and Evangelical Free Church of America denominations.  A Catholic church is located in Alton, Iowa, 3 miles east of Orange City.

Notable people

 Nick Collison (born 1980) Former NBA power forward for the Oklahoma City Thunder (2003-2018)
 Jordan De Jong (born 1979) is a former MLB pitcher for the Toronto Blue Jays (2007).
 Howard Heemstra (1928–2011), architect, professor of architecture, and photographer, born in Orange City.
 Terry L. Huitink (1951–2014), judge of the Iowa Court of Appeals, was born in Orange City.
 Tyler James (born 1982) is a singer/songwriter.
 James Kennedy (born 1963) is an American historian.
 Dennis Muilenburg (born 1964) is a former president and CEO of the Boeing Company.
 Tyler Mulder (born 1987) is a track and field athlete for the Oregon Track Club.
 Dr. Samuel Noordhoff (1927–2018), surgeon and missionary in Taiwan from 1959 to 1999, is the founder of the Noordhoff Craniofacial Foundation.
 Kenneth Veenstra, an Iowa state legislator and businessman, lived in Orange City.
 Cora Vander Broek (born 1977) is a Tony Award-nominated actress.

References

Further reading

External links

 Orange City
 City-Data Comprehensive Statistical Data and more about Orange City

 
Dutch-American culture in Iowa
Cities in Sioux County, Iowa
Cities in Iowa
County seats in Iowa
1884 establishments in Iowa